Polyipnus ovatus is a species of ray-finned fish in the genus Polyipnus. It is found in the South China Sea, Celebes Sea, and Java Sea with a depth range of 194 - 209 m.

References

Sternoptychidae
Fish described in 1994